Dr. Wilfred Edward Shewell-Cooper  (15 September 1900 – 21 February 1982) was a British organic gardener and pioneer of no-dig gardening. He wrote and published several books, including Soil, Humus and Health (1975), The Royal Gardeners (1952), Grow Your Own Food Supply (1939), and The ABC of Vegetable Gardening (1937). In 1966, he founded the Good Gardeners Association. For many years, his gardens at Arkley Manor were open to the public, allowing the results of his no-dig methods, indicated by a symbol featuring a robin resting on a spade handle, to be seen first-hand.

Childhood and education 
Shewell-Cooper was born in Waltham Abbey, Essex, England in 1900. His father, E. Shewell-Cooper, was a major in the Royal Artillery and was also the assistant superintendent of the gunpowder factory in Waltham Abbey. From there, the family moved to Blackheath, London, and then to Penarth, Wales. Before the outbreak of World War I, the family set sail on the Galaka for South Africa, where they lived in Rondebosch, now a suburb of Cape Town. While there, he went to school at Diocesan College. When he returned to England, he attended Monkton Combe School just outside Bath.

Family and career 
Shewell-Cooper, married Irene Ramsey Pennicott. He was a prolific author of gardening books and together they wrote a cookery book called Cook What You Grow (1940). They had two sons, Ramsay and Jeremy.

Over the course of his life, Shewell-Cooper held a number of positions, some of which are listed below:
 Fellow of the Horticultural Society of Vienna
 Director of the Horticultural Educational and Advisory Bureau
 Principal of the Horticultural Training Centre
 Hon. Superintendent of the Swanley Horticultural College
 Horticultural advisor to the Warwickshire and Cheshire County Councils
 Hon. Treasurer of the Westbank House, Hextable, 1937–38
 Garden editor of the BBC North Region
 Command Horticultural Officer, S.E. and Eastern Commands, 1940–1948

Arkley Manor 
In 1960, Sir John Laing suggested that Shewell-Cooper move to Arkley Manor; this was his home until his death in 1982.

Legacy

Ramsay Shewell-Cooper, who died in 2016, continued to promote his father's no-dig gardening approach and, as of 2008, a demonstration plot was to be seen at Capel Manor College in Enfield, in conjunction with the Good Gardeners' Association.

Bibliography 
Shewell-Cooper's published works include:

See also
Organic gardening

References

1900 births
1982 deaths
English gardeners
British garden writers
People educated at Monkton Combe School
Organic gardeners
People from Waltham Abbey, Essex
20th-century British botanists
Members of the Order of the British Empire